Madang Museum is a museum in Madang, Papua New Guinea, which displays objects from its locality and the East Sepik province.

Background
In 1975 the suggestion arose that a local museum should be created in Madang, an idea that was supported by the government of the province, expatriates, and local tourist businesses. The museum opened on 6 June 1981. It was opened by Kaki Angi, then Minister for Tourism for the province. The museum shares a building with the Madang Visitors and Cultural Bureau. In 2015 the museum underwent a restoration programme, led by ethnographer and volunteer Mary Mennis. Madang Provincial Government covers wages and utility costs for the museum, but other funding comes from private donations.

Collections and research
The museum collection contains both ethnographic and natural science objects. One notable object is a head-dress from Bosmum village which was worn as part of a male initiation ritual. As of 2008 approximately half of the objects on display were from Madang and the rest from East Sepik Province. The museum was a partner in a research project which explored diet in the region over the last millennium through zooarchaeological analysis, as well as lipid analysis.

References

1981 establishments in Papua New Guinea
Museums established in 1981
Museums in Papua New Guinea
Local museums
Madang Province
East Sepik Province